Wayne Wright Fitzgerrell (March 17, 1908–May 11, 1965) was an American farmer and politician.

Biography
Fitzgerrell was born in Sesser, Illinois and graduated from Sesser High School. He worked as a coal miner and was the foreman at the Old Ben Coal Mines in Buckner, Illinois. Fitzgerrell was a farmer and raised live stock and grain in Franklin County, Illinois. Fitzgerrell served in the Illinois House of Representatives from 1957 until his death in 1965. He was a Republican. Fitzgerell was killed in an automobile accident on U.S. Route 66 in Illinois just north of Farmersville, Illinois in Montgomery County, Illinois.

Legacy
The Wayne Fitzgerrell State Recreation Area, near Benton, Illinois, was named for Fitzgerrell.

Notes

External links

1908 births
1965 deaths
People from Franklin County, Illinois
Farmers from Illinois
Republican Party members of the Illinois House of Representatives
Road incident deaths in Illinois
20th-century American politicians